Verner Motor is a Czech aircraft engine manufacturer based in Šumperk. The company specializes in the design and manufacture of piston engines for homebuilt and ultralight aircraft.

The company's first engine was the horizontally-opposed Verner 1400, which was developed into the  Verner VM 133. The  Verner JCV 360 was also part of the product line until about 2013 when the company ended production of its horizontally-opposed engines to concentrate on the producing radial engines, starting with the Verner Scarlett 7H seven cylinder, four stroke radial, aimed at the antique and replica market.

Aircraft engines

References

External links

Company website archives on Archive.org

Aircraft engine manufacturers of the Czech Republic